The Mole Gap Trail is a  official walking route alongside the River Mole, linking the Surrey towns of Dorking and Leatherhead.  The trail is marked on Ordnance Survey maps. The trail runs through Norbury Park, the village of Westhumble and across Denbies Wine Estate.

Gallery

See also
Long-distance footpaths in the UK
Thames Down Link
North Downs Way
London Loop

References

External links

Footpaths in Surrey
Long-distance footpaths in England